The Krištopans cabinet was the government of Latvia from 26 November 1998 to 16 July 1999.  It was led by Prime Minister Vilis Krištopans.  It took office on 26 November 1998, after the October 1998 election.  It was replaced by the third Šķēle cabinet on 16 July 1999, after Krištopans's resignation.

Cabinets of Latvia
1998 establishments in Latvia
1999 disestablishments in Latvia
Cabinets established in 1998
Cabinets disestablished in 1999